Ammanford is a town and community in Carmarthenshire, Wales, with a population of 5,411 at the 2011 census. It is a former coal mining town. The built-up area had a population of 7,945 with the wider urban area even bigger.

According to the 2001 census, 75.88% of the population were competent in the Welsh language, compared to roughly 61% in Carmarthenshire as a whole and 21.8% in Wales as a whole.

Ammanford is served by the A483 and A474 roads. Ammanford railway station is a stop on the Heart of Wales Line, with trains to Llanelli and Swansea to the south and Shrewsbury to the north.

Ammanford is twinned with Breuillet, Essonne.

History 
The town of Ammanford is a relatively modern settlement. It was originally known as Cross Inn, named after an inn that was located at a location where a number of roads converged. During the nineteenth century, as a result of the growth of both the tinplate and anthracite coal trades, a village grew around the Cross Inn (which later became known as Ammanford Square).

As the settlement expanded, prominent residents came to the view that its name should be changed since there were a number of other places named Cross Inn in Carmarthenshire alone. In 1880, a number of public meetings were held, and in November 1880 it was resolved that the name Ammanford (i.e. "ford of the River Amman") adopted.  The meeting was chaired by Watcyn Wyn. It took several years for the new name to be widely adopted, but the decision of the Great Western Railway to change the name of the Cross Inn station to Ammanford in June 1883 was welcomed by residents and tradesmen.

Twentieth century 
The Ammanford Anthracite Strike was a riot at Ammanford in 1925 during a strike by anthracite miners who took control of the town by force and violence for 10 days. 200 Glamorgan police were ambushed by strikers at Pontamman Bridge during the so-called 'Battle of Ammanford'.

Ammanford hosted the National Eisteddfod in 1922 and 1970.

Government

Parliamentary elections
Ammanford was part of the Carmarthenshire county constituency until it was divided in 1885 whereupon the town was located in the East Carmarthen constituency which was held until its abolition in 1918 by the Liberal Party. The Labour Party captured Llanelli in 1922 and have held it ever since. The MP from 1936 until 1970 was Jim Griffiths, a native of nearby Betws. However, in 1997, Ammanford was transferred to the new Carmarthen East and Dinefwr seat which was captured in 2001 by Adam Price of Plaid Cymru.

Local government

Ammanford was part of Carmarthenshire County Council from 1889 until 1974 and was usually represented by Labour councillors. It became part of Dyfed County Council from 1974 until 1996. Following the abolition of Dyfed it became, once again, part of Carmarthenshire, now a unitary authority. The northern part of Ammanford was part of the Pontamman ward, until the May 2022 local elections.

Ammanford Urban District Council was formed in 1903 in consequence of sharp population growth. It was absorbed into Dinefwr Borough Council upon re-organization in 1974. Dinefwr in turn was absorbed into the Carmarthenshire unitary authority in 1996. Ammanford's Town Council has continued as a community council. The community is bordered by the communities of: Llandybie; Betws; and Llanedi, all being in Carmarthenshire.

Religion
Ammanford is in the ecclesiastical parish of Ammanford and Betws. Ammanford formed part of the ancient parish of Llandybie although the parish church at Betws was much closer to the town. The established church was, however, slow to react to the growth of an urban community.

The nonconformist denominations, in contrast, were far more active and Ammanford was an important location as the 1904–1905 Welsh Revival unfolded. Prominent chapels include Ebeneser (Baptist), Gellimanwydd (Christian Temple) (Independent) and Bethany (Presbyterian Chuch of Wales). There is an active Christadelphian community based in the town centre, in addition to various Evangelical and Apostolic Churches. The global Apostolic Church grew out of this area and until recently still held the Annual Apostolic Convention at nearby Penygroes.

Developments
On 4 July 2002, Ammanford was granted Fairtrade Town status. This status was renewed by the Fairtrade Foundation on 27 December 2003.

Notable people 
 Irwyn Ranald Walters (1902–1992), musician and conductor; founded the National Youth Orchestra of Wales
 Rae Jenkins MBE (1903–1985), violinist and light orchestra conductor
 Donald Peers (1908–1973), singer
 Rheinallt Nantlais Williams (1911–1993), Professor of Philosophy of Religion and theologian
 Ieuan Rees (born ca.1941), renowned artist & stone mason
 John Rhys-Davies (born 1944), actor (The Lord of the Rings film trilogy)
 Neil Hamilton, MP (born 1949), grew up in the town
 Christine Jones (born 1955), a Welsh artist and ceramicist 
 Rick Smith (born 1959), musician (Underworld) and composer.
 Adam Price (born 1968), politician and leader of Plaid Cymru
 Alex Jones (born 1977), television presenter on S4C and the BBC's The One Show 
 Gareth Jewell (born 1983), actor
 Owain Wyn Evans (born 1984), BBC presenter and drummer.
 Sara Gregory (born 1986), actress
 Alexandra Roach (born 1987), actress

Sport 
 Tom Evans (1882-1955), a Welsh international rugby union flanker with 18 caps for Wales
 David Davies (1902–1992), rugby union and professional rugby league footballer
 Tommy Davies (1920–1998), a Welsh Middleweight boxer and Wales middleweight champion from 1943 until 1949.
 Terry Boyle (born 1958), a Welsh former professional footballer, with over 500 club caps
 Caitlin Lewis (born 1999), a Welsh Rugby Union player who plays wing for the Wales women's national rugby union team
 Lucy Packer (born 2000), rugby union player, member of the England women's national rugby union team

Sport
A motorcycle speedway long-track meeting, one of the few held in the UK, was staged in a village out lying Ammanford, called Tairgwaith. Local football team Ammanford A.F.C. play in the Cymru South, while rugby union team Ammanford RFC were formed in 1887 and play in the Welsh Rugby Union leagues. The local cricket team Ammanford Cricket Club are a major part of sports in the community/town. They won the South Wales Premier Cricket League in 2012 but in 2013 got relegated back to the South Wales Cricket Association 1st Division. The 1st team is captained by ex-Glamorgan cricketer Alun Evans (cricketer)

References

Sources

External links

Unofficial Town website

 
Towns in Carmarthenshire
Communities in Carmarthenshire